Rock of Ages: The Band in Concert is a live album by the Band, released in 1972. It was compiled from recordings made during their series of shows at the Academy of Music in New York City, from December 28 through December 31, 1971. It peaked at No. 6 on the Billboard 200 chart, and was certified a gold record by the RIAA. An expanded release of recordings taken from the same series of shows, called Live at the Academy of Music 1971, was released in 2013.

Concerts
The Band booked a residency at the Academy of Music for the last week of 1971, culminating in a New Year's Eve performance.  Four nights were recorded, December 28 through 31.

Robbie Robertson had commissioned New Orleans songwriter and arranger Allen Toussaint to compose horn charts for their recent single "Life Is a Carnival" from the album Cahoots, and decided to have Toussaint write special charts for a five-man horn section to augment the group at the upcoming concerts. The initial charts written by Toussaint in New Orleans were in luggage lost at the airport, and a new set was composed in a cabin near Robertson's house in Woodstock. Robertson selected eleven songs to receive horn charts (all of the original Rock of Ages album except for "Get Up Jake", "Stage Fright", "This Wheel's on Fire", "The Weight", "The Shape I'm In", and "The Genetic Method.").

The repertoire consisted of material from all four of the Band's studio albums up to that point, plus one new original song, "Get Up Jake", and three covers.  The group played the 1964 Motown hit single "Baby Don't You Do It" by Marvin Gaye, another Motown song, the 1966 hit single "Loving You Is Sweeter Than Ever" by the Four Tops, and "(I Don't Want To) Hang Up My Rock and Roll Shoes", the b-side of Chuck Willis' final single.

Bob Dylan, their old employer, made a surprise visit on the New Year's Eve show, playing the final four songs with the group in the early morning hours of January 1, 1972.  The horn section added spontaneous flourishes to "Down in the Flood" and "Rolling Stone".

Releases

These recordings have been released many times, with significant changes to the track list, running order, and mix.  Originally released in 1972 as a double album, it was reissued in 1980 as two separate LPs, titled Rock of Ages, Vol. 1 and Rock of Ages, Vol. 2. The first edition for compact disc in 1987 was released as an "abridged version"; "The Genetic Method" (Garth Hudson's instrumental solo/introduction to "Chest Fever") was omitted, but later re-instated on the unedited two-disc version released in 1990. A budget re-release on CD was also issued in 1990 named The Night They Drove Old Dixie Down: The Best of the Band Live in Concert. On May 8, 2001, an expanded and remastered two-disc edition appeared, with the original album on one disc, and an additional ten tracks on a bonus disc, including the four songs with Bob Dylan from his guest appearance on the final night.

The 2005 retrospective box set A Musical History contains 9 tracks from these concerts, newly remixed from the multitrack tapes, including a previously unreleased performance of the song "Smoke Signal" from the December 28 show. A hybrid SACD reissue of the original album was released on the Mobile Fidelity Sound Lab label in 2010.

In 2013, Capitol released Live at the Academy of Music 1971: The Rock of Ages Concerts, as both a two-CD set, and as a box set that contains a new stereo mix of all previously released material from the concerts with a new running order, plus the previously unreleased performance of "Strawberry Wine" from the December 28 show.  The box set includes the same two discs, plus two discs containing the complete December 31 show in its entirety (11 tracks are duplicates of the first two discs, but the rest were previously unreleased), and a DVD containing most of the first two discs of audio in 5.1 surround mixes and video of "King Harvest (Has Surely Come)" and "The W.S. Walcott Medicine Show."

The song "Chest Fever" from this album is available as downloadable content for the video game Rock Band.

Track listing

Rock of Ages

Side one

Side two

Side three

Side four

2000 reissue bonus disc

Live at the Academy of Music 1971

Disc 1

Disc 2

Personnel
The Band at the Academy of Music concerts

The Band
 Robbie Robertson – guitar, backing vocals, introduction
 Garth Hudson – organ, piano, accordion, tenor and soprano saxophone solos
 Richard Manuel – vocals, piano, organ, clavinet, drums
 Rick Danko – vocals, bass guitar, violin
 Levon Helm – vocals, drums, mandolin

Additional musicians
 Howard Johnson – tuba, euphonium, baritone saxophone
 Snooky Young – trumpet, flugelhorn
 Joe Farrell – tenor and soprano saxophones, English horn
 Earl McIntyre – trombone
 J.D. Parron – alto saxophone and E-flat clarinet
 Bob Dylan – vocals, guitar on "Down in the Flood", "When I Paint My Masterpiece", "Don't Ya Tell Henry", and "Like a Rolling Stone"

Production
 Allen Toussaint – horn arrangements
 Phil Ramone – engineer
 Mark Harman – engineer

Charts

Certifications

References

The Band live albums
1972 live albums
Capitol Records live albums
Albums recorded at the Palladium (New York City)